Estadio Monumental, officially Estadio Más Monumental for sponsorship reasons, and popularly known as "River Plate Stadium", "Monumental de Núñez", or simply "El Monumental", is a stadium in Belgrano, Buenos Aires (although popular belief wrongly states that the stadium is in the Núñez district), home venue of Club Atlético River Plate.

It was opened on 26 May 1938 and named after former club president Antonio Vespucio Liberti (1900–1978). It is the largest stadium in both Argentina and all of South America with a capacity of 83,196 (84.567 in 2024) and is also home of the Argentina national football team. It was the main venue in the 1951 Pan American Games. It hosted the 1978 FIFA World Cup Final between Argentina and the Netherlands. Additionally, it hosted four finals of the Copa América, most recently in 2011.

History
The Club Atlético River Plate was founded in 1901 and by 1934, it had won two championships. At the time, the club was nicknamed "Los Millonarios" (The Millionaires in Spanish) because of the purchase of forward Carlos Peucelle for whom River had paid a huge amount of money. On 31 October 1934, River Plate purchased the land where the club was to build the new stadium in the neighborhood of Belgrano.

El Monumental was built on land reclaimed from the marshy coast of Río de la Plata. On 25 May 1935, the cornerstone was laid on the Centennial (now Figueroa Alcorta) and Río de la Plata (Udaondo) Avenues. On December 1 of that year, the Steering Committee presented the approved project in detail to its members at an assembly. They obtained a loan of $2,500,000 from the government and on 27 September 1936, construction began under the direction of architects José Aslan and Héctor Ezcurra.

The initial cost of work reached the figure of $4,479,545.80, but was reduced to about 3 million dollars when the committee decided to halt the construction of the north end of the stadium due to a lack of adequate funds.

The foundation of the stadium was to be six or eight feet deep. This required open pit excavation to ensure the stability of the ground, and pumping bilge water from the site. The construction of the three stands was completed in two years. There are 50 km of steps, with 26,000 square meters of reinforced concrete and almost 3,000 tons of steel.

The stadium was inaugurated on Wednesday 26 May, amidst a crowd of approximately 70,000 people. They witnessed the handing over of an Argentine flag, one from the club, paid for by a group of associates, and then sang the national anthem and the River Plate chant.

The next day, nearly 68,000 spectators were present. After various activities the evening ended with a match between River Plate and Uruguay team Peñarol, with a 3–1 victory for the home squad. In the 2016-17 league season, River Plate drew an average home attendance of 37,000, the second highest in the league.

Notable events 
When the Monumental project was originally designed, it consisted of four double decker stands. As the bank loan was not enough to carry out the entire project, the stadium was left with a horseshoe shape. The horseshoe was partially enclosed in 1958, under the club presidency of Enrique Pardo. The new construction, the first tier Colonia stand, was financed by proceeds from the mn$10 million transfer of Omar Sivori to Juventus of Italy. With the new construction the stadium's capacity reached 90,000.

The stadium was remodelled and finally completed to meet the original project after Argentina was awarded the right to host the 1978 World Cup. River Plate was lent money by the Military Government in charge of the country at the time but they struggled to meet repayments due to the changes of currency, which had a detrimental effect on the team. Monumental was the headquarters for the 1978 World Cup. The venue was opened on June 1 for the match between West Germany and Poland. They hosted seven more games, including the final between Argentina and the Netherlands.

San Lorenzo earned the record for highest number of people attending a match for a visiting team in 1982. In their second division match against Tigre, San Lorenzo (which did not have a stadium at the time), brought more than 70,000 people to River's stadium. In 1975 when River played Racing for the title (after an 18 years drought) 100,000 were present. At the end of the 1986 and 1996 Copa Libertadores second-leg finals (both against América de Cali), more seats were added and approximately 86,000 spectators were in attendance. It is estimated that for the Argentina versus Uruguay 1987 Copa América semifinal more than 87,000 spectators attended. In 1993, in a qualification match for the 1994 FIFA World Cup, Argentina lost 5–0 to Colombia, its greatest ever defeat at home. Since then, however, Argentina had never lost a match in World Cup qualifying within this stadium until Ecuador won 2–0 on October 8, 2015.

The total length of the seating in the stands of the stadium is over 70 kilometers.

Sporting events 
The Monumental, aside from being River Plate's home ground, also accommodates the Argentina national football team in their home games for events such as the FIFA World Cup qualification.

The Monumental also hosted the closing ceremonies and the athletics events of the First Pan American Games in 1951. The stadium host the first Super Special Stage of the 2007 Rally Argentina of WRC.

Rugby union matches featuring the Argentina national rugby union team, Los Pumas, also take place occasionally on this field, although the Pumas more frequently play at other stadiums.

Football

1978 FIFA World Cup 
The stadium served as venue for the following matches during the World Cup:

International friendly matches

Rugby union test matches

Concerts 
When an international performing artist or band visits Buenos Aires, the concerts are usually held in this stadium, as it is the biggest in the city and in all of Argentina.

In December 1987, former leader of The Police, Sting, performed at River Plate making his debut in Argentina as soloist. He was the first artist to perform with sold out tickets at that venue.

The stadium played host to Amnesty International's final Human Rights Now! Benefit Concert on 15 October 1988. The show was headlined by Bruce Springsteen and the E Street Band, and also featured Sting, Peter Gabriel, Tracy Chapman, Youssou N'Dour, León Gieco and Charly García the concert was attended by 75,000 people.

David Bowie's Sound+Vision Tour was held on 29 September 1990. He sold more than 81,900 tickets from only one show.

On 5 October 1990, Eric Clapton played a concert during his Journeyman World Tour in front of a sold-out crowd of 70,000 people.

INXS performed at the stadium on 22 January 1991 during The X Factor World Tour.

Prince performed at the stadium in January 1991 as part of a Rock & Pop Festival. The festival included singers Robert Plant, Joe Cocker and Billy Idol, among others.

Elton John performed at the stadium on 21 and 22 November 1992 during The One Tour. It was his first performance in Argentina.

Paul Simon performed at the stadium in December 1992 on Derby Festival. The festival included the following bands The Cult, John Kay, Inspiral Carpets, among others.

Guns N' Roses first performed at the stadium with two concerts on 5–6 December 1992, as part of their Use Your Illusion Tour. Over half a year later on 16–17 July 1993, the band played two additional concerts as the final shows of the same tour, marking their last performances with most of their original lineup for over two decades. Twenty-three years later, the group reunited with classic members Slash and Duff McKagan, playing two shows on 4–5 November 2016, as part of the Not in This Lifetime... Tour.

In 1993, the American superstar Michael Jackson performed three sold-out concerts as part of his Dangerous World Tour at the stadium, on 8, 10 and 12 October, for a total audience of 225,000 fans (75,000 people per show). The last concert was recorded for a documentary however, it was later cancelled by Michael Jackson due to him being unsatisfied with the performance. However, this concert leaked online. (Live in Buenos Aires: The Dangerous Tour)

Paul McCartney played three concerts at the stadium in December 1993 during The New World Tour, for the first time in the country. Seventeen years later he returned to Argentina to play two concerts to a crowd of 82,000, as part of his Up and Coming Tour in November, 2010.

Phil Collins performed at the stadium on 23 and 24 April 1995 during the Both Sides of the World Tour.

The Rolling Stones performed five sold-out concerts at the stadium during the Voodoo Lounge Tour in 1995. The British band performed five times once again in 1998 for the Bridges to Babylon Tour, and two more times in 2006 during the A Bigger Bang tour. These last concerts were released as part of the four-disc concert DVD The Biggest Bang in 2007.

Seminal punk rock band The Ramones played their final South American show on 16 March 1996.

Also Luis Miguel sold out two consecutive concerts for over 120,000 thousand people during two nights in December 1996. Luis Miguel is the only Latin artist that have broken records of assistance in Argentina.

Backstreet Boys performed at the stadium on 28 April 2001 during Black & Blue Tour.

On 6 October 2001 Eric Clapton performed at the stadium during his Reptile World Tour, selling a total of 35,000 tickets.

Red Hot Chili Peppers played a concert at the stadium on 16 October 2002 during their By The Way Tour. Later they played another concert on 18 September 2011 during the I'm with You World Tour. In 1998 Irish rock band U2 brought their PopMart Tour to South America and performed Mothers of the Disappeared with the Mothers of the Plaza de Mayo, the mothers of the children who had disappeared under the Argentinian and Chilean dictatorships, brought on stage. The band returned again for their Vertigo Tour in 2006 to film what would become U23D, the first live-action, 3D digital film.

Madonna performed two sold-out concerts in October 1993 during The Girlie Show and another four in December 2008, during her Sticky & Sweet Tour; two of these concerts were filmed and later released on a CD/DVD titled Sticky & Sweet Tour. She holds the record for fastest sell-out of a concert at the stadium for her first show, with more than 263,000 tickets sold in three hours. She also performed at the stadium on 13 and 15 December 2012 as part of The MDNA Tour.

In 2003, the international pop singer Shakira played a sold-out concert during her Tour of the Mongoose, being the first and only female Latin artist to sell out River Plate Stadium. Robbie Williams performed at the stadium on 14 and 15 October during his 2006 Close Encounters Tour. On 15–16 May 2007, High School Musical performed their hits from High School Musical The Tour, entitled High School Musical The Concert

Aerosmith performed at the stadium in 2007 on Quilmes Rock show. The attendance was over 70,000 Spectators. The festival included the following bands Keane, Evanescence, Velvet Revolver, Bad Religion, The Psychedelic Furs. The Police performed at Estadio Monumental on 1 and 2 December 2007 during their Reunion Tour. In 2008, the band released the live CD/DVD Certifiable that was recorded during this concerts.

In 2009 the British band Oasis presented one of the biggest concerts in their history. Noel Gallagher and the Argentine public shared an emotional moment, playing "Don't Look Back in Anger".

AC/DC performed three sold-out shows in December 2009, during their Black Ice World Tour. These shows were filmed and released on the DVD and Blu-ray Live at River Plate, in May 2011. In November 2012, they released a live album of the second of the three shows, which happened on 4 December.

New Jersey rockers Bon Jovi have played the stadium numerous times, most recently in 2010 as part of The Circle Tour.

The band Coldplay performed at the stadium on 26 February 2010 during Viva la Vida Tour. They returned in 2022 and played a record-breaking ten shows as part of their Music of the Spheres World Tour, the most of any musical act at the stadium. These shows were on 25, 26, 28 and 29 October and 1, 2, 4, 5, 7 and 8 November. Throughout all of the shows, the band brought in 626,841 spectators in total, as well as 49.7 Million dollars of box score revenue, which is the most in Latin America's concert history.

In May 2011, Miley Cyrus brought her Gypsy Heart Tour which sold out in a week, filling the stadium with 65,000 people, becoming the third female artist to fill the stadium after Shakira and Madonna.

Roger Waters performed nine concerts at the stadium in March 2012, during which he and his band performed The Wall in its entirety on their 2010-2012 The Wall Live tour. Kiss played on 3 September 1994; 14 March 1997; 10 April 1999; 5 April 2009 and 7 November 2012. The 2009 concert was recorded and eventually released as a live six song DVD included on the Sonic Boom three disc package. Lady Gaga performed a sold-out show here for her tour The Born This Way Ball on 16 November 2012.

The Monsters of Rock festival was held in the stadium in 1994 and 1999 with Kiss, Black Sabbath, Slayer, Metallica, and Sepultura. Metallica again performed at the stadium in 2010 in the World Magnetic Tour.

Iron Maiden performed at the venue on 27 September 2013 as part of the Maiden England World Tour. The British metallers performed for over 60,000 people in a 145-minute show.

Soda Stereo performed the final concert on 20 September 1997 during the farewell tour. This concert was recorded and released in two parts, El Último Concierto A and B and DVD. Later they performed a series of six sold-out historic concerts at the stadium in 2007 during the tour Me Verás Volver, holding the record of the South American and Spanish bands, with the most sold-out concerts at the same stadium. One of the concerts was recorded and became the CD/DVD Gira Me Verás Volver

Facilities 

The stadium can house 74,624 people, after its renovation for the 1978 World Cup. The opening and final matches were both held in the Monumental, which had a capacity of 76,600 at the time because all of the popular stands were standing-only.

The stadium complex also has facilities for tennis, basketball, and other sports, as well as living quarters for young footballers, a theatre hall, a parking lot, museum etc. It can be accessed by several train and bus lines as it is located within walking distance from the Barrancas de Belgrano transportation hub. Contrary to most other stadiums in the Buenos Aires area, there is a sizable car park outside the stadium.

2014–2016 renovation 
In the recent years, with the new administration, the stadium has gone through an extensive renovation program that ranged from the people's logistic to the stadium's display.
In November 2014, the stadium's display was removed and a new full-color led was installed; this one is 19.45 m wide and 7.16 m tall, tripling the size of the old one and making it the largest in a South American stadium. On the same period a new Paddock Club and hospitality seatings were installed at field level.
In August 2015, the Ciudad Universitaria station was opened on the Belgrano Norte Line in order to serve both the stadium and the University of Buenos Aires' Ciudad Universitaria campus located on the other side of the tracks. The stadium is linked to the station with a viaduct and the line connects the stadium to both central Buenos Aires through its Retiro terminal and also some of the city's northern outskirts. There were extensive renovations in the bathrooms, and led screens were installed in boxes and stalls.
In November 2015, the River Plate Museum was fully renewed: attractions were added and a River Plate store were built, where officially licensed products are sold.
In December 2015, a tempered glass envelope was installed over the outer lower rings of the stadium to create a better ambience to the spectators.
The renovation plan is still in progress as the club seeks funding for a large improvement plan which includes raising the capacity of the stadium to 84,567 spectators.

See also
Club Atlético River Plate
Antonio Vespucio Liberti
List of stadiums by capacity

References

External links

Stadium picture
In depth history of 'El Monumental'
History of the stadium 'El Monumental' (written by fans)

Club Atlético River Plate
Sports venues in Buenos Aires
1978 FIFA World Cup stadiums
Monumental
Monumental
Sports venues completed in 1938
1938 establishments in Argentina
Argentina
Copa América stadiums
Pan American Games opening ceremony stadiums
Pan American Games athletics venues
Rally Argentina
Rugby union stadiums in Argentina